Offenbach an der Queich is a Verbandsgemeinde ("collective municipality") in the Südliche Weinstraße district, in Rhineland-Palatinate, Germany. The seat of the municipality is in Offenbach an der Queich.

The Verbandsgemeinde Offenbach an der Queich consists of the following Ortsgemeinden ("local municipalities"):

 Bornheim 
 Essingen 
 Hochstadt 
 Offenbach an der Queich

Verbandsgemeinde in Rhineland-Palatinate
Südliche Weinstraße